Sigi Holzbauer is a retired West German slalom canoeist who competed in the mid-1950s. He won two gold medals at the 1955 ICF Canoe Slalom World Championships in Tacen, earning them in the folding K-1 event and the folding K-1 team event.

References

German male canoeists
Possibly living people
Year of birth missing (living people)
Medalists at the ICF Canoe Slalom World Championships